Stone's Been Rolled Away is the second album in the live praise and worship series of contemporary worship music by Hillsong Church. In 1997 the album was certified gold by Australian Recording Industry Association (ARIA) for shipment of 35000 units.

Making of the album
Stone's Been Rolled Away was recorded live by Geoff Bullock, Darlene Zschech and the Hillsong team.
This is the first album from Hillsong Church that was released on video as well as CD, Cassette and Music Book.

Album design
Stone's Been Rolled Away was designed by Wyld Concepts Graphics & Promotions. The front cover features a Ken Duncan panograph of sand dunes.
The cover artwork uses Times New Roman font for the title.

Several of the songs were written by Geoff Bullock.

Russell Fragar, Darlene Zschech, Robert & Debbie Eastwood, David Willersdorf, Daniel Grul, John Ezzy & Steve McPherson contributed to songs also.

Reception 

In August 1999 Mike Rimmer of Cross Rhythms rated the album as 5 out of 10 and described the album as "There are a few classic songs that turn up here including the title song 'Jesus Lover of My Soul' and 'I Believe'. A couple of lovely moments but in truth this is far too ordinary to justify you spending your dosh here".

Track listing
 "The Stone's Been Rolled Away" (Geoff Bullock) - Lead Vocal: Darlene Zschech, b. Geoff Bullock
 "You Give Me Shelter" (Geoff Bullock) - Lead Vocal: Sylvia Pettit & Steve McPherson
 "Your Name" (Darlene Zschech) - Lead Vocals: David Evans, Sylvia Pettit & Darlene Zschech
 "I Bow My Knee (I'll Love You More)" (Robert & Debbie Eastwood) - Lead Vocals: Sylvia Pettit & David Evans
 "Let Your Presence Fall" (David Willersdorf) - Lead Vocal: Darlene Zschech, b. David Evans
 "Holy Spirit Come" (Bullock) - Lead Vocals: Geoff Bullock, Darlene Zschech, David Evans, Steve McPherson & Sylvia Pettit
 "Holy One of God" (Bullock) - Lead Vocals: Darlene Zschech, b. David Evans 
 "I Believe" (Bullock) - Lead Vocals: Darlene Zschech & Steve McPherson
 "Make Me Your Servant" (Russell Fragar) - Lead Vocals: Darlene Zschech, David Evans & Steve McPherson
 "Jesus Lover of My Soul" (Daniel Grul, John Ezzy & Steve McPherson) - Lead Vocal: Darlene Zschech, b. David Evans "Oh Holy Spirit" (Bullock) - Lead Vocals: Darlene Zschech  & Geoff Bullock "Within Your Love" (Bullock) - Lead Vocals: Sylvia Pettit, b. Geoff Bullock "I Surrender" (Bullock) - Lead Vocals: Sylvia Pettit, b. Steve McPherson "You Are the One" (Bullock) - Lead Vocals: Darlene Zschech''

(b. = Lead Backing Vocal)

Credits
Worship Leader/Pastor
 Geoff Bullock
Music Director
 Russell Fragar
Vocal Director
 Darlene Zschech
Choir Directors
 Annabelle Smart, Janine Bullock

Lead Vocals
 Darlene Zschech
 Steve McPherson
 David Evans
 Sylvia Pettit
Backing Vocals
 Lucy Fisher
 Donia Makedonez
 Rebecca King
 Steve Ollis
 Deborah de Jong
 Gail Dunshea
 Debbie Steinhardt
 Nicholas Hood
 Scott Haslem

Choir
 Hills Christian Life Centre Singers

Piano
 Geoff Bullock
Keyboards
 Russell Fragar
Guitars
 David Moyse, Allan Chard
Acoustic Guitar (Unplugged)
 Matthew Wakeling
Bass Guitar
 Paul Ewing
Drums
 Adam Simek
Percussion
 Stuart Fell

Executive Producer
 Brian Houston
Producers
 Geoff Bullock, Russell Fragar
Engineers
 Jeff Todd, Russell Fragar
Assistant Engineer
 Andrew McPherson
Production Manager
 Cameron Wade
Front Of House Engineer
 Nick Asha
Foldback Engineer
 Peter Manlik

References 

1993 live albums
Hillsong Music live albums